Antigua, My Life is a 2001 Argentine-Spanish drama film directed by Héctor Olivera and written by Ángeles González Sinde, from the novel by the Chilean writer Marcela Serrano. It stars Ana Belén and Cecilia Roth. Many scenes of the film were shot in Guatemala.

Cast 
 Ana Belén ....  Josefa Ferrer
 Cecilia Roth ....  Violeta Dasinski
 Daniel Valenzuela ....  Sargento
 Jorge Marrale ....  Andrés
 Diana Lamas ....  Pamela
 Guido D'Albo ....  Locutor TV
 Juan Leyrado ....  Eduardo
 Nicolás Agüero ....  Borja
 Josefina Gracián ....  Celeste
 Sawa Tramer ....  Zulema
 Alfredo Casero ....  Alejandro
 Christian Inglizze ....  Artesano (as Christian Inglize)
 Odiseo Bichir ....  Emilio Palma
 Cristi Cobar ....  Doña Rogeria
 Dario Tangelson ....  Maza
 Iván Moschner ....  Maître

Reception 
Actress Cecilia Roth was nominated for a Silver Condor Award for Best Actress in 2002.

References

External links 
 

2001 films
2000s Spanish-language films
2001 drama films
Films directed by Héctor Olivera
Films set in Argentina
Argentine drama films
Spanish drama films
2000s Argentine films